Lin Hung-chih (born 22 August 1955) is a Taiwanese politician.

Education
Lin earned a bachelor's degree in transportation and communications management from National Cheng Kung University, before obtaining his master's in political science at National Chengchi University.

Political career
Lin launched a bid for a seat on the National Assembly in 1991, and served until 2000. While a member of the assembly, he was elected mayor of Banqiao, and reelected in 2001. Lin stepped down in 2005 at the end of that second term to run for the Legislative Yuan. He was twice reelected to the Legislative Yuan, in 2008 and 2012, but refused to stand in the 2016 election, because his party, the Kuomintang, had suffered heavy losses in the November 2014 local elections.

References

1955 births
Living people
New Taipei Members of the Legislative Yuan
Kuomintang Members of the Legislative Yuan in Taiwan
Mayors of places in Taiwan
Members of the 6th Legislative Yuan
Members of the 7th Legislative Yuan
Members of the 8th Legislative Yuan
National Cheng Kung University alumni
National Chengchi University alumni